People's Party Work for Prosperity (Bosnian and Croatian: Narodna stranka Radom za Boljitak; abbr. NSRzB) is a multi-ethnic party in Bosnia and Herzegovina. It was founded and is run by Mladen Ivanković-Lijanović, from Široki Brijeg.

References 

Liberal parties in Bosnia and Herzegovina
Secularism in Bosnia and Herzegovina